Balao is a town in Ecuador. It may also refer to:

 
 Balao-class submarines
 Hemiramphus balao, a fish
 Balão Mágico, a Brazilian children's show
 Turma do Balão Mágico, a Brazilian children's music group that starred on the TV show